Krasny Vostok is a rural locality (a settlement) in Zelenodolsky Selsoviet, Petropavlovsky District, Altai Krai, Russia. The population was 20 as of 2013. There are 2 streets.

Geography 
Krasny Vostok is located on the Anuy River, 15 km north of Petropavlovskoye (the district's administrative centre) by road. Nikolayevka is the nearest rural locality.

References 

Rural localities in Petropavlovsky District, Altai Krai